Helck is a surname. Notable people with the surname include:

  (died 1770), German mathematician, teacher, and author of a collection of fables
 Peter Helck (1893−1988), American illustrator
 Wolfgang Helck (1914−1993), German Egyptologist